Enteromius ansorgii is a species of ray-finned fish in the genus Enteromius. It is endemic to Angola.

The fish is named in honor of explorer William John Ansorge (1850-1913), who collected the type specimen.

Footnotes 

Endemic fauna of Angola
Enteromius
Taxa named by George Albert Boulenger
Fish described in 1904